FXI may refer to:

 Air Iceland (ICAO airline code: FXI), a former Icelandic airline
 Factor XI, an enzyme
 FXI Technologies, a Norwegian electronics manufacturer
 Fuxin railway station (rail station code: FXI), Beijing–Shenyang High-Speed Railway, Jingshen Passenger Railway, China

See also
 FX (disambiguation)